Andrew Torrence may refer to:

 Andrew P. Torrence (1920–1980), African-American university administrator
 A. Andrew Torrence (1902–1940), American lawyer and politician